Joseph Richardson (24 August 1908 – 1977) was an English professional footballer who played as a right back.

Richardson joined Blyth Spartans from local side New Delaval Villa. His form with Spartans was impressive enough to earn a £250 move to Newcastle United in 1929. He went on to play over 200 league games for the Magpies, and after ending his playing career in 1938 joined the coaching staff where he remained until 1977, serving the club for 48 years. He died in 1977.

References

1908 births
1977 deaths
People from Bedlington
Footballers from Northumberland
English footballers
Association football fullbacks
Blyth Spartans A.F.C. players
English Football League players
Newcastle United F.C. players
England wartime international footballers